Luigi is a fictional character (Mario’s younger twin brother) created by Nintendo for the Mario franchise.

Luigi may also refer to:

People 
Luigi (name), an Italian given name, includes a list of people with that name
Luigi Verderame, Belgian singer usually known just as Luigi
Abbot Luigi, a talking statue in Rome

Fictional characters
 Luigi (Cars), 1959 Fiat 500 in the Pixar movie Cars
 Luigi Risotto, a minor character from The Simpsons
 Luigi (Coronation Street), a recurring character in the UK TV series Coronation Street

Places
 Luigi Island, an island in Franz Josef Land, Russian Federation

Music
"Luigi", single by Louis Prima and His Orchestra, written Antonio, Araco, L. Di Leo 1953	
"Luigi", song from The Crooked Mile (musical) 1959

Other uses 
 Luigi series, a video game series

See also 
 Lugii
 Weegee (disambiguation)